Rhayader railway station was a station serving the town of Rhayader, Powys, on the Mid Wales Railway line.

It was opened in 1864 in Cwmdauddwr, a village on the opposite bank of the River Wye.  The line, which took over 5 years to build, was closed in 1962 and dismantled within months.

The station was the junction for the Elan Valley Railway which was in operation between 1896 and 1916.

The site of the station is now occupied by Powys county council's highways department.

References

Notes

Sources

Further reading

Disused railway stations in Powys
Former Cambrian Railway stations
Railway stations in Great Britain opened in 1864
Railway stations in Great Britain closed in 1962
Rhayader